James Coblentz is a film editor most recognised for his work on the television series The X-Files. In 1994 he won an International Monitor Award for his work on the X-Files episode Beyond the Sea. In 1995 he was nominated for both an International Monitor Award and also an Emmy for the episode Duane Barry.

Filmography
Final Destination
The One
The Long Kiss Goodnight (uncredited)The People Under the StairsIt's My TurnFoxesRunawayReturn of the Living Dead: NecropolisNational Lampoon Goes to the MoviesCurse of Chucky''

References

External links

American film editors
Living people
American television editors
Year of birth missing (living people)